The Chikulamayembe are a dynasty of kings established among the Tumbuka people in the Nkhamanga-Henga area of Northern Malawi. The Chikulamayembe originally ruled from around 1805, becoming weaker from the 1830s and losing power by the 1870s and their dynasty was re-established in 1907.

The origin of the Chikulamayembe

The Tumbuka people 
The Tumbuka people probably entered the area between the Luangwa valley and northern Lake Malawi in the 15th century. At the start of the 18th century, they formed a number of groups, most of which lived in homesteads growing Finger millet and herding goats and sheep. These were thinly scattered over the plateau between the Luangwa valley and Lake Malawi, in small, independent communities with limited central organisation. One group, the Henga, occupied the Henga Valley north of Rumphi; another, the Phoka lived south of the Nyika Plateau. In the 18th century, the Luangwa valley, the plains south of the Nyika Plateau and the Henga valley had significant elephant populations and the Henga, and Phoka people of these areas had local chiefs with status but limited authority.

The arrival of Mlowoka 
In the 18th century, increasing demand for ivory in Europe led to the expansion of the ivory trade in East and Central Africa, financed by merchants based in Kilwa Kisiwani and Zanzibar. By the mid-18th century, traders dressed as Arabs although coming from the Unyamwezi region of what is now Tanzania were involved in trading for ivory as far inland as the Luangwa valley. One such group, consisting of traders and possibly elephant hunters under a leader named Mlowoka, meaning "one who crossed (the lake)", arrived looking for ivory among people for whom ivory had little value. Mlowoka was traditionally supposed to have landed at Chilumba on the lakeshore and moved inland to an area west of the Nyika Plateau. It is not certain whether these traders intended to settle, but their control of the trade goods exchanged for ivory gave them economic power. They formed marriage alliances with local Henga chiefs and, to secure a monopoly over local ivory trading, Mlowoka established his leading followers at strategic points on the routes from the elephant-rich areas among the Henga and Phoka to the shore of Lake Malawi. Today the Mlowoka have blended with the Tumbuka such that they are indistinguishable as a separate tribe, however clan names from the original Mlowoka have survived such as 'Gondwe'. Among those to cross with Mlowoka on the same 'plank' were, Katumbi, Kabunduli, Mwahenga, Kyungu, Chipofya and Mwamlowe.

The 19th century dynasty 
A son of Mlowoka, named Gonapamuhanya/Khalapamuhanya who was also (on his mother's side) the nephew of a leading Tumbuka clan head, is said to have become a paramount chief or king of the areas west and south of the Nyika Plateau around 1805 and founded the Chikulamayembe dynasty. This, however, only had a loose control over a federation of small subordinate chiefdoms and what it controlled was less a territorial state than a trade route for ivory. Even the chiefdoms established by Mlowoka's followers from Unyamwezi were practically independent. By the 1830s, this Chikulamayembe dynasty was in decline as Swahili traders in slaves and ivory entered the area and took over its trading system, reducing it to a state of political disorganisation, and its existence was ended by the Ngoni invasions in the 1860s and 1870s on. When the Chikulamayembe state ceased to exist, its people either fled or remained as unfree agricultural workers or enrolled in Ngoni regiments.

Revival

Choosing a Themba 
The Northern Ngoni finally accepted British rule in 1904 and the Tumbuka people ceased to be their vassals or returned from where they had taken refuge. European missionaries found the Tumbuka ready to accept Western education and supported their wish to have a paramount chief of their own. The Chikulamayembe claim to chieftainship over a wide area was supported by a history of the Tumbuka written in 1909 by Saulos Nyirenda and translated in 1931 by a missionary, which greatly exaggerated the power of the Chikulamayembe in the 19th century. This version of Tumbuka history was accepted by the colonial authorities.

There were several candidates wishing to become paramount chief, all descendants of Gonapamuhanya, but the colonial administration chose Mbawuwo Mgonanjerwa Gondwe, who was westernised, and gave him the title Themba (chief) Chikulamayembe in 1907. This made him paramount chief of the Tumbuka people, and other chiefs in the area were subordinated to him.

The Themba’s powers 
At first, the role of the Themba Chikulamayembe was largely ceremonial, but in 1913 he was given a role in assisting the local district commissioner. However, in the 1920s the colonial administration favoured the introduction of indirect rule and proposed that the north of Malawi should be divided into three districts, each with one predominant ethnic group, each one having a paramount chief. When the Native Authority Ordinance was passed in 1933, the Themba Chikulamayembe was made native authority over all Tumbukaland, with his own budget. Native courts were also introduced following the passing of the Native Courts Ordinance, 1933, giving the Themba appellate jurisdiction over cases from his sub-chiefs. 
 
The first Themba died in 1931, being succeeded by his son Ziwange, generally known as John Hardy Gondwe, who ruled from 1932 until his death in 1977, when he was succeeded by his son Walter Gondwe. In late November 2018 Walter Gondwe died after a two-week illness and has been succeeded as Themba by his son.

List of rulers of the Nkhamanga kingdom of the Tumbuka

References

Sources
 S. B. Chirembo, (1993). Colonialism and the Remaking of the Chikulamayembe Dynasty 1904 – 1953, The Society of Malawi Journal, Vol. 46, pp. 1–14.
 Y. A. Chondoka and F. T. Bota, (2015). The History of the Tumbuka 1400 – 1900, Bloomington, XLibris Corporation, .
 M. Douglas (1950). Peoples of the Lake Nyasa Region: East Central Africa, Part 1, London International African Institute.
 J. McCracken, (2012). A History of Malawi, 1859–1966, Woodbridge, James Currey. .
 B. Morris, (2006). The Ivory Trade and Chiefdoms in Pre-Colonial Malawi, the Society of Malawi Journal, Vol. 59, No. 2, pp. 6–23.
 T. J. Thompson, (1981). The Origins, Migration and Settlement of The Northern Ngoni, The Society of Malawi Journal, Vol. 34, No. 1, pp. 6–35
 H. L. Vail, (1972). Suggestions Towards a Re-Interpreted Tumbuka History. In B. Pachai (ed). The Early History of Malawi. London: Longman

Government of Malawi
History of Malawi